Hypercompe amulaensis is a moth of the family Erebidae first described by Herbert Druce in 1889. It is found in Mexico.

References

amulaensis
Moths described in 1889